Aci, Galatea e Polifemo (HWV 72) is a dramatic cantata—also called a serenata—by George Frideric Handel. It was first performed at Naples on 19 July 1708; the completed score is dated to 16 June 1708. The serenata was commissioned by Duchess Donna Aurora Sanseverino for the wedding festivities of the Duke of Alvito, Tolomeo Saverio Gallo, and Beatrice Tocco di Montemiletto, Princess of Acaja and niece of Aurora Sanseverino.
 
The Italian libretto was written by Nicola Giuvo, private secretary and literary adviser of Duchess Sanseverino.
The plot is virtually the same as in Handel's later English-language pastoral opera Acis and Galatea, but Handel drew little on the music of the cantata when he returned to the story in 1718, although he did take care to introduce the half-lovable villain — the one-eyed giant Polyphemus — with another signature comic aria, faster and demanding virtuosity of a different kind than the one in Aci (see below), namely, "O ruddier than the cherry."

The role of Polifemo (Polyphemus), a cyclops whose actions have lethal consequences for Aci (Acis), is particularly notable for the vast range and singular vocal agility required. The part ranges from the D below the bass staff to the A above it — and that in his main satirical slow, ponderous buffa aria, "Fra l'ombre e gl'orrori". The role may have been taken at the premiere by the bass Antonio Manna, who sang at the court chapel in Vienna.

References
Notes

Sources
Hawkes, Katy (2019). "Programme Note" in programme to Aci, Galatea e Polifemo HWV72, Wigmore Hall, London, 3 April 2019.
Hogwood, Christopher. Handel (1988), Thames and Hudson, .

External links 
  
 Score of Aci, Galatea e Polifemo (ed. Friedrich Chrysander, Leipzig 1892)
 Libretto from www.haendel.it

Cantatas by George Frideric Handel
1708 compositions
1708 cantatas
Operas based on Metamorphoses